Kashmir Khan (born 2 December 1995) is an Afghan cricketer. He made his first-class debut for Kabul Region in the 2018 Ahmad Shah Abdali 4-day Tournament on 22 April 2018.

References

External links
 

1995 births
Living people
Afghan cricketers
Kabul Eagles cricketers
Place of birth missing (living people)